This is a list of gliders/sailplanes of the world, (this reference lists all gliders with references, where available) 
Note: Any aircraft can glide for a short time, but gliders are designed to glide for longer.

E

Edgars (glider constructor)
(Latvia)
 Edgars Laksevics

Edgley
(Edgley Sailplanes Ltd / (Edgley Aeronautics Ltd) / John Edgley)
 Edgley EA-9 Optimist

EEL
(Entwicklung und Erprobung von Leichtflugzeugen)
 EEL ULF 1
 EEL ULF 2

EFF 
(Entwicklungsgemeinschaft für Flugzeugbau)
 EFF Prometheus 1
 EFF Prometheus 19
 EFF Prometheus 12
 EFF Prometheus PV

EFW
(Eidgenössische FlugzeugWerke Emmen)																																																																																																																																																																																																																																																																																																																																																																																																																																																																																																																																																																																																																																																																																																																																																																																																																																																																																																																																																																																																																																																															
 EFW N-20.01

Eggleton (glider constructor)
 Eggleton 1912 glider

EIA
(Escuela de Ingeniería Aeronáutica - school of aeronautical engineering)
 EIA Biplaza
 EIA Monoplaza

Eiri-Avion O/Y
See PIK.

Ek-Bader
(R. Ek & H. G. Bader Wagonfabrik Fuchs, Heidelberg)
 Heidelberg Kurpfalz Sauzahn

Ekolot
(PPHU Ekolot, Krosno, Poland)
Ekolot JK 01A Elf

Elżanowski
(Z. Elżanowski)
 Elżanowski ZE-1 Cytrynka (Cytrynka – lemon) – 'Start' Aviation Circle

Elan 
(Elan Tovarna Sportnega Orodja N.SOL.O)
 DG-100 Elan
 DG-101 Elan
 DG-300 Elan
 DG-300 Club Elan
 DG-300 Elan Acro
 DG-303 Elan

Eliferov
 Eliferov Aviafak 1 – Елиферов Авиафак 1

Ellehammer
(Jacob Ellehammer, Denmark)																																																																																																																																																																																																																																																																																																																																																																																																																																																																																																																																																																																																																																																																																																																																																																																																																																																																																																																																																																																																																																																															
 Ellehammer N°1																																																																																																																																																																																																																																																																																																																																																																																																																																																																																																																																																																																																																																																																																																																																																																																																																																																																																																																																																																																																																																																															
 Ellehammer N°3

Elliotts of Newbury
 Elliotts Primary EoN
 EoN Type 5 Olympia 1
 EoN Type 5 Olympia 2
 EoN Type 5 Olympia 3
 EoN Type 5 Olympia 4
 EoN Type 5 Olympia 401
 EoN Type 5 Olympia 402
 EoN Type 6 Olympia 403
 EoN Type 6 Olympia 415
 EoN Type 6 Olympia 419
 EoN Type 7 SG-38
 Elliotts Primary EoN Known as Eton TX.1 by R.A.F.
 EoN Type 8 Baby Eon
 EoN Type 9 K.1
 EoN Type 10 Eon 460
 EoN Type 10 Eon 463
 EoN Type 10 Eon 465
 EoN Target – Spec. WT1/RDL.3 in competition with Slingsby T.39; not built.

Elsässer-Obrecht-Hügli
(E. Elsässer, A. Obrecht & Hügli)
 Elsässer Röbi

Elsnic
(Ludvík Elsnic)
 Elsnic EL-1
 Elsnic EL-2-M Šedý vlk
 Elsnic EL-2-M Šedý vlk M

Elżanowski
(Z. Elżanowski)																																																																																																																																																																																																																																																																																																																																																																																																																																																																																																																																																																																																																																																																																																																																																																																																																																																																																																																																																																																																																																																															
 Elżanowski ZE-1 Cytrynka

EMBRAER
(Instituto Tecnológico de Aeronáutica de São José dos Campos / Empresa Brasileira de Aeronáutica)
 Embraer EMB-400 Urupema

Emelyanov
(V. I. Emelyanov)
 Emelyanov KIM-1 – Емельянов КИМ-1
 Emelyanov KIM-2 – Емельянов КИМ-2
 Emelyanov KIM-3 Stakhanovets – Емельянов КИМ-3 Стахановец
 Emelyanov RV-1 – Емельянов РВ-1 - Рекорд Высоты- 1

Engineering Division 
(Engr Division, McCook Field, Dayton OH; Hampton Roads VA)
 Engineering Division GL-1																																																																																																																																																																																																																																																																																																																																																																																																																																																																																																																																																																																																																																																																																																																																																																																																																																																																																																																																																																																																																																																															
 Engineering Division GL-2																																																																																																																																																																																																																																																																																																																																																																																																																																																																																																																																																																																																																																																																																																																																																																																																																																																																																																																																																																																																																																																															
 Engineering Division GL-3

E.N.S.A.E.
 E.N.S.A.E. Farfelu

Enser
(F.G Enser)
 Enser Mk.1

ENSMA 
(École Nationale Supérieure de Mécanique et Aérotechnique {Société Scientifique de recherche et de Promotion du Planeur Léger})
 ENSMA FS-25 F Cuervo
 ENSMA Two-seater
 Cuervo 2

Erfurt
(Erfurter Verein für Luftfahrt eV, Erfurt / E. Rommel)
 Erfurt Erfurt

Erla
(Erla Maschinenfabrik GmbH, Leipzig - Franz Xaver Mehr)
 Erla 6-A
 Erla Me-4 glider
 Erla Me-4a motor glider

Espenlaub
(Gottlob Espenlaub)
 Espenlaub E-01
 Espenlaub E-02 – designer:Alexander Lippisch
 Espenlaub E-03
 Espenlaub E-04
 Espenlaub E-05
 Espenlaub E-09
 Espenlaub E-11a
 Espenlaub E-12
 Espenlaub E-14
 Espenlaub E-15
 Espenlaub E-15 Rak
 Espenlaub E-32
 Espenlaub E-33
 Espenlaub Motorsegler
 Espenlaub Rakete
 Espenlaub S
 Espenlaub Schleppflugzeug
 Espenlaub Schulflugzeug

Esztergom
(Esztergom Facility of Pest Area Machine Factory (PGE) - formerly Sportárutermelõ V., Esztergom)
 Esztergom EV-1K Fecske
 Esztergom E-31 Esztergom

ETA
(ETA Aircraft / Flugtechnik Leichtbau, Braunschweig)
 Eta (glider)

Etheridge
(S. Day, C. Etheridge & P. Etheridge)
 Etheridge 1933

Etrich-Wels
(Igo Etrich & Franz Wels)
 Etrich-Wels 1904 kite/glider
 Etrich-Wels 1906 glider – Etrich's Leaf

Europa
(Europa Management Ltd)
 Europa MG

EuroSport
 EuroSport Crossover

Explorer
(Explorer Aircraft Company Inc. / Bill Skliar)
 Explorer PG-1 Aqua Glider aka Skliar PG-1 Aqua Glider

Notes

Further reading

External links

Lists of glider aircraft